Usma Parish is an administrative unit of the Ventspils Municipality, Latvia.The parish has a population of 583 (as of 1/07/2010) and covers an area of 219.509 km2.

Villages of Usma Parish 
 Amjūdze
 Desuciems
 Ugāles dzirnavas
 Usma
 Usmas stacija
 Zaļais ciems
 Žatu ciems

Parishes of Latvia
Ventspils Municipality